A Heraion  or Heraeum  is a temple dedicated to the Greek goddess Hera

Notable temples include:
Heraion of Samos, the most important of the sanctuaries dedicated to Hera
Heraion of Argos, near Nafplion in Argolis
Heraion of Perachora (Hera Akraia and Hera Limenia), near Corinth
Temple of Hera (Olympia)
Heraion of Metapontum, usually known as the Tavole Palatine, in Magna Graecia
Heraion at the mouth of the Sele, Paestum, Magna Graecia
Second Temple of Hera (Paestum), Paestum, Magna Graecia
Heraion of Selinunte

Heraion may also refer to:
Heraion (Bithynia), an ancient Greek town in Bithynia, also known as Heraia
Heraion (Thrace), an ancient Greek city in Thrace, also known as Heraion Teichos
the sea-side village near the temple dedicated to Hera in Samos

See also 
:Category:Temples of Hera
Temple of Juno (disambiguation)